The 1942 NCAA Swimming and Diving Championships were contested March 27, 1942 at the Indoor Athletic Building at Harvard University in Cambridge, Massachusetts at the sixth annual NCAA-sanctioned swim meet to determine the team and individual national champions of men's collegiate swimming and diving in the United States. 

Yale topped the team standings, claiming the Bulldogs' first title in program history. Yale topped five-time defending champions Michigan by 32 points to take the team championship.

Team standings
Note: Top 10 only
(H) = Hosts

See also
List of college swimming and diving teams

References

NCAA Division I Men's Swimming and Diving Championships
NCAA Swimming And Diving Championships
NCAA Swimming And Diving Championships
NCAA Swimming and Diving Championships 
Sports in Cambridge, Massachusetts
History of Cambridge, Massachusetts
Tourist attractions in Cambridge, Massachusetts
Swimming in Massachusetts
Sports competitions in Massachusetts